The 1991 Michigan Wolverines football team represented the University of Michigan in the 1991 NCAA Division I-A football season. The team's head coach was Gary Moeller. The Wolverines played their home games at Michigan Stadium. The team was undefeated in the Big Ten Conference and was led by Heisman Trophy-winner Desmond Howard, Butkus Award-winner Erick Anderson and national statistical champion Elvis Grbac. The team won the fourth of five consecutive Big Ten championships. The team lost to national champion Washington Huskies in the 1992 Rose Bowl.

Schedule

Roster

Coaching staff
Head coach: Gary Moeller
Assistant coaches: Tirrel Burton, Cam Cameron, Lloyd Carr, Jerry Hanlon, Bill Harris, Jim Herrmann, Les Miles, Bobby Morrison, Tom Reed
Trainer: Paul Schmidt
Managers: Brian Bickner, Scott Hanel, David Henderson, Marc Jacobson, Andy Riegler, Dave Schueler, Lance Satterthwaite, Mark Vainisi, Michael Weiskopf

Rankings

Statistical achievements
Desmond Howard surpassed Anthony Carter's 11-year-old conference single-season record of 14 touchdown receptions by totaling 19, which continues to be the conference record. During the season, he extended his consecutive games with a touchdown reception streak to 13 games, surpassing Carter's 9, set in 1980, a record that still stands. J. D. Carlson established the current Big Ten record for consecutive successful point after touchdown conversions at 126.

Grbac won the first of his back-to-back passing efficiency NCAA Division I FBS championships. He also won his second of three consecutive Big Ten passing statistical championships (177.8 passing efficiency in conference games and 161.7 in all games). Desmond Howard was the repeat Big Ten receiving yardage champion for all games with 82.1 yards per game and he won his only conference games yardage championship with a 90.1 average. Howard was also the scoring champion with an 11.3 points per game average in conference games and an 11.5 average overall.

The team led the Big Ten in rushing offense both in conference games (264.6 yards per game) and all games (231.9 yards per game). They also led in passing efficiency for both conference games (166.5) and all games (154.7). They were the conference leader in total offense both for conference games (453.6 yards per game) and all games (419.8 yards per game). They were also the Big Ten scoring statistical champions for conference games (39.5 points per game) and all games (35.0 points per game).

The team earned the second of four consecutive and six 1990s Big Ten rushing defense statistical championships for all games by holding opponents to 105.4 yards per game.  The team also earned the first of five consecutive and six 1990s Big Ten rushing defense statistical championships for conference games by holding opponents to 102.0 yards per game. The team led the Big Ten Conference in scoring defense for conference games (11.4 points per game), while Iowa led for all games.  They led the conference in turnover margin (+1.13) in conference games and (+0.92) in all games. They led the conference in punt return average in conference games (16.3 yards per return) and all games (14.7).

Grbac posted his second (a school record that he would later extend) and the school's fifth 4-touchdown performance against Florida State on August 28.  His season total of 25 touchdown passes surpassed his own school record of 21 set the prior year. His junior year total of 54 touchdown passes set a new school record, eclipsing Rick Leach's total of 48 set in 1978. He also tied Jim Harbaugh's 1986 single-season completion percentage record of 65.0, which was surpassed the following year by Todd Collins. On September 14, his 20–22 performance against Notre Dame established the current single-game completion percentage, eclipsing his own September 16, 1989 17–21 performance against Notre Dame. On September 7, Howard became the third Michigan receiver to post a 3-touchdown reception performance and on October 19, he became the first two do so twice (a feat later matched by David Terrell and Braylon Edwards). The following season Derrick Alexander would become the only Wolverine to post a 4-touchdown reception performance. Howard also tied Carter's record of three consecutive 100-yard receiving games, a record tied by Marcus Knight in 1999 and eclipsed by Edwards in 2003 who posted four.

Game summaries

Boston College

Desmond Howard’s 93 yard kickoff return for a touchdown to start the 2nd half sparked the Wolverines to a 35-13 victory over Boston College. The Eagles had closed to 14-13 early in the 4th quarter. BC had jumped to 10-0 lead after the 1st quarter, but the Wolverines rallied behind Howard’s four touchdowns. Howard caught three touchdown passes from Elvis Grbac. Lance Dottin returned an interception 50 yards for a touchdown to close out the scoring for Michigan. Ricky Powers led the ground attack with 176 yards rushing.

Notre Dame

    
    
    
    
    
    

Michigan, ranked #3, jumped to a 17-0 lead late in the 2nd quarter and held on for a 24-14 win over #7 Notre Dame. Desmond Howard scored twice, on a 29-yard run and a 25-yard reception from Elvis Grbac on 4th and inches, which effectively clinched the game. The latter would become known as "The Catch" and helped propel Howard to the Heisman Trophy. Ricky Powers ran for 164 yards and a touchdown while Grbac completed 20 of 22 passes for 195 yards. Lance Dottin had an interception and John Carlson kicked a 22 yard field goal. With the win, the Wolverines ended a four-game losing streak against the Irish.

Florida State

A matchup of two teams ranked in the top 3 ended in a blowout, 51-31, in favor of Florida State. It would be FSU's 10th consecutive victory, while marking the sixth time Michigan had lost to a No. 1 team in an eight-year stretch. The 51 points was the third-highest total by an opponent in Michigan history, the most ever by a visitor at Michigan Stadium and the most in any game against the Wolverines since Northwestern scored 55 in 1958. Eight Florida State touchdowns—scored by seven players—tied for the most a Michigan team has allowed. The #1 ranked Seminoles confused and pressured #3 ranked Michigan into four interceptions, three thrown by quarterback Elvis Grbac. Two were returned for touchdowns. Terrell Buckley's stunning 40-yard return on Michigan's second offensive play was the first of his two interceptions. Michigan was held to a total of 120 rushing yards.

Iowa

    
    
    
    
    
    
    
    
    
    
    

The Hawkeyes led 18–7 midway through the second quarter, but could not stop the Michigan ground game as the Wolverines rolled up 371 yards rushing on 50 attempts. Jesse Johnson led the way with 168 yards and a touchdown while Elvis Grbac completed 14 of 22 passes for 196 yards and three touchdown passes. Desmond Howard caught a 20 yard and a 2 yard TD reception. Johnson caught a 28 yard TD pass from Grbac as well. The Wolverines rolled up 567 yards of total offense on their way to a 43-24 victory.

Michigan State
Elvis Grbac threw three 1st half touchdowns, including two of them to Desmond Howard as they jumped to a 21-0 lead on the way to a 45-28 pasting of the Spartans. Ricky Powers rushed for 148 yards and Jesse Johnson ran for two touchdowns as the Wolverines rang up 326 yards on the ground. The Michigan defense held Michigan State to 84 yards rushing, while Dave Ritter and Cole Wallace each had interceptions. Howard had 8 catches for 101 yards.

Indiana
The #4 ranked Wolverines were pushed to the limit by the Hoosiers, but held on and prevailed 24-16 in a tightly contested game. The Hoosier defense held the Wolverines to 261 yards of total offense. Thanks to Desmond Howard and Elvis Grbac, the Wolverines pulled out the win on three Grbac TD passes to Howard. John Carlson added a 36 yard field goal.

Minnesota
Once again it was the Grbac and Howard show as the #4 ranked Wolverines stormed out to a 28-0 lead on the way to a 52-6 victory over the Golden Gophers and retained the Little Brown Jug for another year. Ricky Powers, Desmond Howard and Tyrone Wheatley each scored two touchdowns. Howard caught 6 passes for 155 yards and Elvis Grbac passed for 242 yards and three TD passes. Pat Maloney and Shonte Peoples had interceptions and the defense held Minnesota to 250 yards of total offense.

Purdue
The Wolverine defense was ferocious and held the Boilermakers to 188 yards of total offense while the offense scored at will as Michigan shutout Purdue, 42-0. Ricky Powers, Tyrone Wheatley and Desmond Howard each scored two touchdowns to lead the Wolverines. Powers and Wheatley on the ground and Howard on passes from Elvis Grbac. Powers finished with 118 yards rushing while Howard had 7 catches for 108 yards. Grbac finished with 175 yards on 11 of 16 completions.

Northwestern
The #4 ranked Wolverines raced to a 45-7 halftime lead on the way to a 59-14 victory over Northwestern. Michigan ran for 368 yards and three Wolverine quarterbacks passed for 259 yards, led by Elvis Grbac who completed 9 of 16 passes for 229 yards and a TD pass. Tyrone Wheatley ran for 141 yards and two touchdowns while Ricky Powers ran for three touchdowns and Jesse Johnson ran for two touchdowns.

Illinois
Desmond Howard and John Carlson provided all the Michigan points as they shutout the Fighting Illini in Champaign, 20-0. Howard caught a 1 yard TD reception and ran 15 yards for his touchdowns while Carlson kicked field goals from 36 and 43 yards. Ricky Powers ran for 151 yards and Jesse Johnson ran for 104 yards. Howard caught 7 passes for 80 yards. The Wolverine defense held the Illini to 49 yards rushing while the offense controlled the ball for over 38 minutes.

Ohio State

Desmond Howard put an exclamation point on his Heisman Trophy winning season with a 93 yard punt return for a touchdown as the Wolverines routed their hated rival Ohio State, 31-3. Howard also caught 3 passes for 96 yards. Tyrone Wheatley, Jesse Johnson and Burnie Legette each had touchdown runs for the Wolverines. The Michigan defense held the Buckeyes to 233 yards of total offense while Kirk Herbstreit was held to completing 8 of 11 passes for 82 yards. Lance Dottin intercepted a pass for the Wolverine defense. John Carlson added a field goal to give Michigan a 17-3 lead in the 2nd quarter. Michigan controlled the ball for nearly 34 minutes in the game.

vs. Washington (Rose Bowl)

    
    
    
    
    
    
    
    

After a scoreless first quarter, the Huskies went ahead as Billy Joe Hobert faked to Beno Bryant and ran off left tackle for two yards and the touchdown. Howard, an electrifying player, would then add another clip to his collegiate highlight film on Michigan's ensuing drive as he snared a leaping, 35 yard reception over eventual NFL first round selection Dana Hall. Three plays later, Elvis Grbac connected with Walter Smith on a 9 yard touchdown pass. Two Travis Hanson field goals made the score 13-7 Huskies at halftime. Washington extended its lead in the third quarter on an 80 yard touchdown drive. Hobert completed a 5 yard td toss to Mark Bruener and the two point conversion to Aaron Pierce. Facing a 21-7 deficit, the Wolverines were again unable to manage a first down and were forced to punt. Excellent field position awaited the Washington offense again, with the ball resting on the Michigan 48. On the second play of the final quarter, Hobert gave a play-action fake and found Pierce in the back of the end zone for a 2 yard touchdown. The Wolverines found themselves trailing 21-7. Michigan started the next drive at their own 29 yard line. Michigan moved the ball out to the 38 yard line before a Grbac keeper on fourth and one was stopped Washington took only six seconds to find the end zone again. Mark Brunell hit Mario Bailey streaking down the right side for the Huskies final score of the game. Tyrone Wheatley, a freshman, capped off an outstanding afternoon (68 yards on 9 carries) and closed the scoring on a 53 yard touchdown run, and J.D. Carlson's 126th consecutive PAT.

Players in the NFL
The following players were claimed in the 1992 NFL Draft.

Awards and honors
The individuals in the sections below earned recognition for meritorious performances.

National
All-Americans: Erick Anderson, Desmond Howard, Matt Elliott, Greg Skrepenak
Butkus Award: Erick Anderson
Jack Lambert Trophy: Anderson
Heisman Trophy: Desmond Howard
Walter Camp Award: Desmond Howard
Maxwell Award: Desmond Howard
Sporting News College Football Player of the Year: Howard
UPI College Football Player of the Year: Howard
Chic Harley Award: Howard
Paul Warfield Trophy: Howard
Jim Parker Trophy: Skrepenak

Conference

Big Ten Football MVP: Desmond Howard
Big Ten Athlete of the Year (all sports): Howard
Big Ten Offensive Player of the Year: Howard
Big Ten Offensive Lineman of the Year: Skrepenak
Big Ten Dave McClain Coach of the Year: Gary Moeller (media)
All-Conference: J.D. Carlson, Dean Dingman, Tripp Welborne, Jon Vaughn, Greg Skrepenak, Desmond Howard, Erick Anderson, Matt Elliott, Mike Evans, Ricky Powers, Elvis Grbac, Chris Hutchinson

Team
Captain: Erick Anderson, Greg Skrepenak
Most Valuable Player: Desmond Howard
Meyer Morton Award: Desmond Howard
John Maulbetsch Award: Steve Morrison
Frederick Matthei Award: Steve Morrison
Arthur Robinson Scholarship Award: David Ritter
Dick Katcher Award: Mike Evans
Hugh Rader Jr. Award: Greg Skrepenak
Robert P. Ufer Award: Matt Elliot
Roger Zatkoff Award: Erick Anderson

References

External links
  1991 Football Team -- Bentley Historical Library, University of Michigan Athletics History

Michigan
Michigan Wolverines football seasons
Big Ten Conference football champion seasons
Michigan Wolverines football